Nyati Cement is one of the youngest cement manufactures in Tanzania and began operations in July 2014. The factory is located in Kimbiji Village, Temeke District, Dar-es-salaam. The brand Nyati cement operates under the banner of Lake Cement Tanzania ltd.

The factory is currently spread across 100 hectares of land in Kimbiji village and has an annual capacity of 500,000 MT.

Plant and Products

The Plant
The current capacity of the plant is 500,000 MT of cement per annum. However the company has shown interest to expand this capacity to 750,000 MT after just one year of operation. Lake cement was also the first cement manufacturer in Tanzania to have its own power plant and vertical roller mill. The company currently operates a 10MW coal fired power-plant. The coal is currently locally sourced from Songea, Ruvuma.

Limestone for the production of cement is obtained by surface mining from the company's mine adjacent to the factory. The factory also has closed clinker storage for up to 30,000 MT.

Products
Lake Cement produces Nyati Cement brand Portland cement grades of:
Type II-B/32.5 N
Type II/42.5 R
Type I /52.5 N

See also
Cement Manufactures of Tanzania
Cement in Africa

References

External links

Companies of Tanzania
Economy of Dar es Salaam
Companies established in 2014
2014 establishments in Tanzania
Cement companies of Tanzania
Tanzanian brands